Housing commission of Housing Commission may refer to:

State housing authorities in Australia
Queensland Housing Commission
Housing Commission of Victoria
Housing NSW

Other
Millennial Housing Commission, a United States inquiry into housing
South Australian Housing Trust, public housing authority in South Australia